Earl Davis (born June 8, 1984), known professionally as Damu the Fudgemunk, is an American hip-hop producer, multi-instrumentalist, DJ, and rapper from Washington, D.C. Damu is a member of the groups Y Society and Panacea, and he co-owns and operates Redefinition Records.

Career 

Davis was raised by two musician parents, and he began making beats in his teens. His official debut album was with Y Society, a duo project with rapper Insight; the record, Travel at Your Own Pace, was released by Tres Records in 2007. The album is reminiscent of true-school hip-hop with its liberal use of jazz, soul samples, and scratching. In 2008, Damu released two free albums primarily composed of instrumental music, titled Spare Time and Overtime. He developed a fan base through his YouTube videos and live street performances around Washington, DC, and New York City, using a portable electricity generator to power his sampler and speakers.

Damu co-owns and operates the vinyl/cassette-enthusiast label Redefinition Records, through which he also releases the bulk of his own music.

In 2019, he collaborated with Raw Poetic and legendary jazz saxophonist Archie Shepp on the improvised album Ocean Bridges, which he released on his label the following year.

In January 2020, Damu visited the London KPM music library, renowned for a collection that has been sampled by artists including MF Doom and Jay-Z. Damu was invited as the first artist to be featured on the Def Pressé / KPM Crate Diggers series, an initiative to release records extensively featuring samples from the library; his work with material from the archives resulted in the album Conversation Peace.

Discography 
 Travel at Your Own Pace (2007)
 Spare Time (2008)
 Overtime (2008)
 ReVISIONS Madvillain (Damu vs Joe Buck) (2009)
 The Bright Side (2009)
 Same Beat Project EP (2009)
 Kilawatt: V1 (2009)
 How It Should Sound (Promo EP) (2010)
 How It Should Sound Volumes 1 & 2 (2010)
 Supply for Demand (2010)
 Brooklyn Flower (2010)
 More Supplies (2010)
 When Winter Comes / Truly Get Yours (2011)
 OverThrone (Try a Little Skillfulness) / All Green (2011)
 Faster Rhyme for Self (2011)
 Kilawatt V1.5 featuring Raw Poetic (2012)
 Spur Momento Trailer (2013)
 Public Assembly (2014)
 Public Assembly Vol.2 (2015)
 How It Should Sound Vol. 3, 4, and 5 (2015)
  HISS ABYSS (How It Should Sound) (2015)
 Untitled Vols. 1 & 2 (2016)
 Vignettes (2017)
 The Reflecting Sea (Welcome to a New Philosophy) (2017) with Raw Poetic
 Ears Hear Spears (Redefinition, 2017) with Insight
 Dreams & Vibrations (Redefinition, 2018) with Flex Mathews
 Ground & Water (2019) with Blu
 Ocean Bridges (Redefinition, 2020) with Archie Shepp and Raw Poetic (Ensemble: Pat Fritz, Aaron Gause, Luke Stewart, Jamal Moore, and Bashi Rose)
 Conversation Peace (Def Pressé, 2021)

References

External links
Damu the Fudgemunk Bandcamp
Redefinition Records Official Website

American hip hop record producers
American DJs
Living people
1984 births